Pierre Ruffaut (born 17 June 1987) is a French professional footballer who plays as midfielder for Andrézieux.

Career
Ruffaut was a longtime player of Moulins, and at the age of 29 transferred to Rodez AF in 2016. He made his professional debut with Rodez in a 2–0 Ligue 2 win over AJ Auxerre on 26 July 2019.

On 3 June 2021 he moved to Cholet on a one-year deal.

On 1 July 2022, Ruffaut signed with Andrézieux in Championnat National 2.

References

External links
 
 
 

1987 births
Living people
People from Vichy
Association football midfielders
French footballers
Rodez AF players
SO Cholet players
Andrézieux-Bouthéon FC players
Ligue 2 players
Championnat National players
Championnat National 2 players
Championnat National 3 players
Sportspeople from Allier
Footballers from Auvergne-Rhône-Alpes